S.S.C. Napoli got extremely close to a shock relegation to Serie B, and only held on to its top-flight status by two points. This was just three years since the club led by playmaker and legend Diego Maradona won the domestic league title. It actually spent Christmas of 1992 in the relegation zone, and climbed out of it thanks to a strong January '93 run. The reason Napoli survived was the above-average offensive skills. Gianfranco Zola, Daniel Fonseca and Careca was a trio capable of leading any teams' attack, and the club looked set to suffer when Zola (Parma) and Careca (Japan) departed at the end of the season. Fonseca's season is mostly remembered for an extremely unusual five goals in one match, as Napoli beat Valencia 5-1 away from home in the UEFA Cup. Then it lost to Paris SG in the next round, rendering it was out of Europe.

Squad

Transfers

Winter

Competitions

Serie A

League table

Results by round

Matches

Topscorers
  Daniel Fonseca 16
  Gianfranco Zola 12
  Careca 7
  Roberto Policano 7

Coppa Italia

Second round

Eightfinals

Quarter-finals

UEFA Cup

First round

Second round

Statistics

Players statistics

References

Sources
  RSSSF - Italy 1992/93

S.S.C. Napoli seasons
Napoli